Art Thief Musical! is a 2004 American short musical film directed by Linus Lau.  It stars Autumn Reeser, Benjamin Sprunger, Matt O'Toole and Sean Smith.  It premiered at the Palm Springs International Festival of Short Films in September 2004.  Inspired by Jacques Demy's The Umbrellas of Cherbourg, all of the "dialogue" throughout the entire film is sung, except for the last two lines.

Cast
Autumn Reeser - Clarity
Benjamin Sprunger - Salvation
Matt O'Toole - Drougray
Sean Smith - Aftershave
Vanessa VanHartesveldt - Chiquie
Stephanie Denise Griffin - Hottie
Jim Blanchette - 1st Detective
Anthony Pellegrino - Femur
Meghan McCormick - Baby
Andréa Supnet - Sexpot
Jeff Pickett - 2nd Detective
Jack Wallace - Police Chief
Richard John Walters - Lieutenant

References

External links
Official website

Technorati reference
KTEH lineup
Elle.com

Commedia all'italiana
American short films
2000s musical comedy films
Sung-through musical films